Wiktor may refer to:

Andrzej Wiktor (1931–2018), Polish malacologist
Wiktor Andersson (1887–1966), Swedish film actor
Wiktor Balcarek (1915–1998), Polish chess player
Wiktor Biegański (1892–1974), Polish actor, film director and screenwriter
Wiktor Brillant (1877–1942), Polish pharmacist
Wiktor Chabel (born 1985), Polish rower
Wiktor Eckhaus (1930–2000), Polish–Dutch mathematician
Wiktor Jassem (1922–2016), Polish phonetician, philologist, linguist
Wiktor Gilewicz (1907–1948), Polish officer
Wiktor Grotowicz (1919–1985), Polish actor
Wiktor Komorowski (1887–1952), Polish pilot
Wiktor Litwiński, Polish politician
Wiktor Olecki (1909–1981), Polish cyclist
Wiktor Ormicki (1898–1941), Polish geographer and cartographer
Wiktor Poliszczuk (1925–2008), Polish-Ukrainian-Canadian politologist
Wiktor Zygmunt Przedpełski (1891–1941), Polish socialist and activist
Wiktor Sadowski (born 1956), Polish artist
Wiktor Suwara (born 1996), Polish athlete
Wiktor Szelągowski (1900–1935), Polish rower
Wiktor Tołkin (1922–2013), Polish sculptor and architect
Wiktor Unander (1872–1967), Swedish officer
Wiktor Wiechaczek (1879–1941), Polish soldier
Wiktor Wysoczański (born 1939), Polish bishop
Wiktor Zieliński (born 2001), Polish professional pool player

See also 
Victor (name)